Silphium compositum, the kidney-leaf rosinweed, is a flowering plant in the family Asteraceae. A perennial in the Silphium genus, it has yellow flowers and is deciduous. It grows in the southeastern United States. It has divided basal leaves.

References

compositum
Flora of North Carolina